The 2017 Asian Men's U23 Volleyball Championship was the second edition of the Asian Men's U23 Volleyball Championship, a biennial international volleyball tournament organised by the Asian Volleyball Confederation (AVC) with Islamic Republic of Iran Volleyball Federation (IRIVF). It was held in Ardabil, Iran from 1 to 9 May 2017. The tournament was served as the Asian qualifiers for the 2017 FIVB Volleyball Men's U23 World Championship held in Cairo, Egypt with the top two ranked teams qualifying for the world championship.

The matches was played in only one stadium in Ardabil: Rezazadeh Stadium. It was the first time that Iran and Ardabil had hosted the tournament. As hosts, Iran automatically participated for the tournament, while the remaining 10 teams (with the withdrawn of Philippines).

Iran won the tournament with a 3–0 final win over Japan. Both finalists qualified for the World Championship.

Participated teams

Pools composition
Teams were seeded in the first two positions of each pool following the Serpentine system according to their final standing of the 2015 edition. AVC reserved the right to seed the hosts as head of pool A regardless of the final standing of the 2015 edition. All teams not seeded were drawn in Bangkok, Thailand on 27 February 2017. But, Philippines later withdrew. Final standing of the 2015 edition are shown in brackets except the hosts who ranked 1st.

Venue

Pool standing procedure
 Numbers of matches won
 Match points
 Sets ratio
 Points ratio
 Result of the last match between the tied teams

Match won 3–0 or 2–1: 3 match points for the winner, 0 match points for the loser
Match won 3–2: 2 match points for the winner, 1 match point for the loser

Preliminary round
All times are Iran Daylight Time (UTC+04:30).

Pool A

|}

|}

Pool B

|}

|}

Pool C

|}

|}

Pool D

|}

|}

Second round
All times are Iran Daylight Time (UTC+04:30).
The results and the points of the matches between the same teams that were already played during the preliminary round shall be taken into account for the classification round.

Pool E

|}

|}

Pool F

|}

|}

Pool H

|}

|}

Classification round
All times are Iran Daylight Time (UTC+04:30).

Bracket

9th place play-offs

|}

9th place match

|}

Final round
All times are Iran Daylight Time (UTC+04:30).

Bracket

Quarter-finals

|}

5th place play-offs

|}

7th place match

|}

5th place match

|}

Semi-finals

|}

3rd place match

|}

Final

|}

Final standing

Awards

Most Valuable Player
 Rahman Taghizadeh
Best Setter
 Masaki Oya
Best Outside Spikers
 Masato Katsuoka
 Esmaeil Mosafer

Best Middle Blockers
 Lee Hsing-kuo
 Sahand Allahverdian
Best Opposite Spiker
 Amin Esmaeilnejad
Best Libero
 Su Hou-chen

See also
2017 Asian Women's U23 Volleyball Championship

References

External links
Official website
Regulations
Squads
Awards

U23, 2017